Danyil Anatoliyovych Sukhoruchko (born 21 February 2000) is a Ukrainian professional football player who plays for Dynamo Kyiv.

Club career
He made his Ukrainian Premier League debut for FC Arsenal Kyiv on 8 December 2018 in a game against FC Zorya Luhansk.

Honours
Dynamo Kyiv
Ukrainian Super Cup: 2018

References

External links
 

2000 births
Living people
People from Sloviansk
Ukrainian footballers
Association football forwards
FC Arsenal Kyiv players
FC Dynamo Kyiv players
FC Chornomorets Odesa players
FC Nyva Ternopil players
Ukrainian Premier League players
Ukrainian First League players
Sportspeople from Donetsk Oblast